Burnin' Sky is the fourth studio album by the English rock band Bad Company. It was released on 3 March 1977. Burnin' Sky was recorded in France at Château d'Hérouville in July and August 1976 with future The Rolling Stones engineer Chris Kimsey. Its release was delayed until March 1977 so to not compete with the band's then-current album Run with the Pack.

The album peaked at No. 15 on the Billboard 200 and No. 17 in the UK Albums Chart.  The album was remastered and re-released in 1994. The cover is similar to the poster for the 1969 Sam Peckinpah film The Wild Bunch. In the 2000 movie Almost Famous, the fictitious band Stillwater's first T-shirt is strikingly similar to the Burnin' Sky album cover.

Track listing
All songs by Paul Rodgers unless otherwise noted.

Personnel
Bad Company
 Paul Rodgers – vocals, guitar, piano, accordion
 Mick Ralphs – guitar, keyboards
 Simon Kirke – drums
 Boz Burrell – bass
with:
 Mel Collins – saxophone, flute
 Tim Hinkley – keyboards
Technical
Chris Kimsey - engineer

Charts
Album – Billboard (United States)

Singles – Billboard (United States)

References

External links 
 Bad Company - Burnin' Sky (1977) album review by William Ruhlmann, credits & releases at AllMusic
 Bad Company - Burnin' Sky (1977) album releases & credits at Discogs
 Bad Company - Burnin' Sky (1977, Deluxe Edition, 2017 Remaster) album to be listened as stream on Spotify

1977 albums
Albums with cover art by Hipgnosis
Bad Company albums
Swan Song Records albums